The United States Commissioner of Food and Drugs is the head of the Food and Drug Administration (FDA), an agency of the United States Department of Health and Human Services. The commissioner is appointed by the president of the United States and must be confirmed by the Senate. The commissioner reports to the Secretary of Health and Human Services.

Due to frequent controversies involving the FDA, appointments are not always prompt and the agency is often headed by an acting commissioner. For example, Andrew von Eschenbach's appointment was held up by senators who objected to the FDA's refusal to allow emergency contraception to be sold over the counter.

The commissioner has frequently been a physician, but this is not a requirement for the post. Commissioners rarely come from a food-related background.

List of commissioners
Unnumbered, colored rows indicate acting commissioners.

See also
 Regulation of therapeutic goods

References

Commissioners of the Food and Drug Administration